On June 21, 2019, the Philadelphia Energy Solutions refinery in Philadelphia, Pennsylvania was the place of an explosion and fire early morning, when a release of hydrocarbons and hydrofluoric acid in the refinery's alkylation unit caused a ground-hugging vapor cloud which rapidly ignited, leading to three separate explosions minutes apart from each other. The largest explosion sent a vessel fragment flying 2,000 feet across the Schuylkill River. Five employees sustained minor injuries, but there were ultimately no fatalities. The refinery announced it would shut down operations the same month, and filed for bankruptcy a month later.

Background 
The Philadelphia Energy Solutions refinery is an oil refinery in Philadelphia, Pennsylvania comprising two separate refineries, the Girard Point and Point Breeze refineries. The last fire to occur at the facility was June 10.

Fire, explosion, and worker response 
On the morning of June 21, 2019, the refinery reported that the alkylation unit of the refinery, which produces high-quality gasoline, was functioning normally. However, shortly after 4 a.m., hydrocarbon gas and hydrofluoric acid released from a ruptured pump pipe elbow. At the time, three field operators were working in the alkylation unit. At 4:01am, one of the operators reported seeing a ground-hugging vapor cloud, estimated by another to be 10 feet high. At 4:02 a.m., the vapor cloud ignited in the unit, causing a massive fire. The field operators in the alkylation unit were able to flee the area and avoid injury.

At 4:03 a.m., a remote control room operator activated the refinery's Rapid Acid Deinventory (RAD) system, routing approximately 339,000 pounds of hydrofluoric acid into an isolated drum for sequestration and safety. At 4:12 a.m., the control room operator attempted to activate the water suppression system intended to suppress the release of hydrofluoric acid, but the system failed to respond. The USCSB report states that the water pump system failed at 4:02 a.m., and the uninterruptible power supply backup failed 9 seconds afterwards. One field operator attempted to walk to the water pumps to manually activate them but reported they were too hot at the time to approach.

At 4:15 a.m., the first explosion occurred in the refinery's alkylation unit, followed by a second explosion at 4:19 a.m. Then, at 4:22 a.m., a vessel containing flammable hydrocarbons (primarily butylene, isobutane, and butane) detonated, causing the largest explosion. Fragments of the vessel, one weighing approximately 38,000 pounds and two other fragments weighing approximately 15,500 and 23,000 pounds, were sent flying; the largest fragment was propelled 2,000 feet across the Schuylkill River.

At 4:39 a.m., the alkylation unit shift supervisor entered the alkylation unit in firefighting protective "bunker gear" and manually activated the water pumps to help suppress the release of hydrofluoric acid from the alkylation unit.

Firefight 

Residents who lived east of the plant were ordered to shelter in place. The fire burned for over 24 hours before it was extinguished at approximately 8:30 a.m. on June 22, 2019, and the shelter-in-place order was lifted.

Investigation and shutdown 
The U.S. Chemical Safety Board’s released its final report on this incident on October 11, 2022. The report stated that a corroded elbow pipe, installed in 1973, ruptured and caused the leak of hydrofluoric acid which ignited the fire. The plant announced it would halt operations completely on June 26, 2019, and filed for bankruptcy on July 22. The shutdown reduced US refining capacity by about 2%.

References

External Links 
U.S. Chemical Safety Board, "Wake Up Call: Refinery Disaster In Philadelphia"
2019 in Pennsylvania
Industrial fires and explosions in the United States